Gwangju Mudeung Stadium is a sports complex in Gwangju, South Korea.  Main stadium  is currently used mostly for football matches and has a capacity of 30,000 people and was opened in 1966. During the 1988 Summer Olympics, it hosted some football matches. This complex has Gwangju Mudeung Baseball Stadium and gymnasium.

References
1988 Summer Olympics official report. Volume 1. Part 1. pp. 204–5.
Official Site 
World Stadiums

Venues of the 1988 Summer Olympics
Olympic football venues
Sports venues in Gwangju
Football venues in South Korea
Multi-purpose stadiums in South Korea
Venues of the 1986 Asian Games